Lenda Murray (born February 22, 1962) is an American professional female bodybuilding champion.

Early life and education
Murray was born in 1962 in Detroit, Michigan, the daughter of Darcelious and Louvelle Murray. She began participating in organized sports at the age of 15. At Henry Ford High School, Murray was both a record-holding sprinter and varsity cheerleader.  She went on to attend Western Michigan University, earning a degree in political science and intended to become a lawyer. While at Western Michigan, she continued to cheerlead, and became the second African American to be chosen as the university’s homecoming queen in 1982.

After a brief tenure cheerleading for the Michigan Panthers in the now-defunct United States Football League, she worked with the Michigan Panthers for two years and then was invited to try out for the Dallas Cowboys cheerleaders. After she auditioned for the group and made the next-to-last cut, she decided she might need to slenderize her thighs a bit.

Bodybuilding career

Amateur career
In 1984, she joined a gym, the Powerhouse Gym, in Highland Park, Michigan. Within the first two days of joining the gym, Ron Love, an NPC Nationals contender told her that she had the physique to be a bodybuilder. After about a year of training to just stay in shape, she decided to compete in the 1985 Ms. Michigan Championships. After placing 4th she was hooked to the sport. Her father didn't show up to her first bodybuilding competition, but eventually did to others. She rose quickly through the ranks, soon winning contests at the state and regional levels. In 1989, she earned her professional status at the IFBB North American Championships.

Professional career

1990–1997
Murray soon became a regular presence in bodybuilding magazines and a favorite subject of photographer Bill Dobbins who focused extensively on her in his books The Women and Modern Amazons.  At the 1990 Ms. Olympia, Murray succeeded six-time champion Cory Everson and defeated Bev Francis to become the Ms. Olympia champion, a title Murray would hold for six years from 1990 to 1995. She appeared in such mass-market publications as Sports Illustrated, Ebony, Mademoiselle, and Vanity Fair, as well as in Annie Leibovitz’s photo essay Women. Murray’s physique became the standard against which professional female bodybuilders are now judged—an hourglass figure, with broad shoulders tapering into a V-shaped torso mirrored by a proportionally-developed lower body. At the 1991 Ms. Olympia, Murray won the slimmest margin of victory for any Ms. Olympia, edging out Bev Francis by a final score of 31 to 32. Afterwards, she would go on to win the Ms. Olympia competition in 1992, 1993, 1994, and 1995.

First retirement
Murray lost the Ms. Olympia title to Kim Chizevsky-Nicholls in 1996, and went into retirement after finishing second to Chizevsky-Nicholls again in December 1997.

2002–2004
However, after four years of retirement she returned to the Ms. Olympia stage, and won two more Ms. Olympia titles in 2002 and 2003. Her coach was Chad Nicholls, a former bodybuilder, drug and nutrition guru and coach for his wife, Kim Chizevsky-Nicholls, along with professional bodybuilder Ronnie Coleman.

Second retirement
She finished second in the heavyweight class to Iris Kyle in 2004, and again retired from competition.

Legacy
Murray has won eight overall Ms. Olympia titles and has two professional wins in her weight class. She is the second most successful female bodybuilder ever, second only to Iris Kyle. From February 28, 2003 to May 31, 2003, she ranked 1st on the IFBB Women's Bodybuilding Professional Ranking List.

Murray has previously done commentary for bodybuilding events on ESPN from 1993 to 1996. In 2010, Murray was inducted into the IFBB Hall of Fame. In March 2011, she became a member of the National Fitness Hall of Fame and received the award from Arnold Schwarzenegger. Every year there is an NPC competition, held at Norfolk State University, called the Lenda Murray Bodybuilding, Figure and Bikini Championships, which she is a promoter and organizer for.

Murray is also spokesperson for Wings of Strength and she owns a nutritional products company Crystal Planet Nutrition.

Competition history
1985 NPC Michigan State - 4th
1985 NPC Eastern Michigan - 1st
1986 NPC Michigan - 3rd
1986 NPC Ironwoman Michigan - 3rd
1987 NPC Michigan - 3rd
1987 NPC North Coast - 2nd
1988 NPC Michigan - 1st
1989 NPC Junior Nationals - 1st (HW and Overall)
1989 IFBB North American Championships - 1st (HW and Overall)
1990 IFBB Ms. Olympia - 1st
1991 IFBB Ms. Olympia - 1st
1992 IFBB Ms. Olympia - 1st
1993 IFBB Ms. Olympia - 1st
1994 IFBB Ms. Olympia - 1st
1995 IFBB Ms. Olympia - 1st
1996 IFBB Ms. Olympia - 2nd
1997 IFBB Ms. Olympia - 2nd
2002 IFBB Ms. Olympia - 1st (HW and Overall)
2003 IFBB Ms. Olympia - 1st (HW and Overall)
2004 IFBB Ms. Olympia - 2nd (HW)

Best statistics

 Biceps - 
 Chest - 
 Height - 
 On season weight:
  (2003 Ms. Olympia)
  (2004 Ms. Olympia)

Personal life
Murray is single and lives in Los Angeles, California with her cats, Martin and William. She is a Christian. She is a grandmother of eleven and a stepmother of four.

Murray has done many videos to help others in their pursuit of fitness, been a professional cheerleader, a physical fitness trainer, a private trainer to professional wrestlers, athletes and others, along with trying out to become a professional wrestler for the World Wrestling Federation in 1997. In November 1990, she founded Lenda Murray Inc. From June 1999 to November 2004, she oversaw the daily operations, administrative and financial activities of The Fitness Firm. From 1999 to 2005, Murray owned a gym in Virginia Beach, Virginia called The Fitness Firm.

Television appearances
Murray has appeared on daytime talk shows like Geraldo, The Montel Williams Show, and The Jerry Springer Show.

Movie appearances
In 2015, Murray appeared in Adam Sandler's The Ridiculous 6 where she played (Terry Crews's character) Chico's mother.

References

Sources

Todd, Jan, "Lenda Murray", St. James Encyclopedia of Pop Culture, Gale Group, 1999

External links
 Lenda Murray Ms. Olympia Official website

! colspan = 3 | Ms. Olympia

1962 births
African-American female bodybuilders
Living people
Sportspeople from Columbus, Georgia
People from Highland Park, Michigan
People from Kalamazoo County, Michigan
People from Muscogee County, Georgia
People from Wayne County, Michigan
Professional bodybuilders
Sportspeople from Detroit
Sportspeople from Los Angeles
Sportspeople from Kalamazoo, Michigan
Sportspeople from Norfolk, Virginia
Sportspeople from Virginia Beach, Virginia
Western Michigan University alumni
21st-century African-American people
21st-century African-American women
20th-century African-American sportspeople
20th-century African-American women
20th-century African-American people